John W. Hulbert Jr. (also John Hurlbert; September 1867 – February 22, 1929) was the executioner for the states of New York, New Jersey and Massachusetts from 1913 to 1926. Hulbert was trained as "state electrician" by his predecessor, Edwin F. Davis, and oversaw 140 executions during his tenure.

Hulbert was initially hired for $50 per execution, although his predecessor had been paid $250. The amount later increased to $150.  According to his colleague, Sing Sing prison physician Amos Squire, Hulbert became significantly depressed about his job, but performed the duty for salary. Hulbert went to lengths to maintain his privacy, never allowed the press to obtain a photograph, and was described in newspapers as "the man who walks alone." Following a nervous breakdown in 1926, Hulbert retired as executioner. He stated, "I got tired of killing people."

In 1929, Hulbert became further depressed over the death of his wife, Mattie, and, at the age of 61, committed suicide by going into the cellar of his home and shooting himself. He was buried beside his wife in Soule Cemetery, Sennett, New York.

See also
 List of executioners

References

1867 births
1929 suicides
People from Auburn, New York
American executioners
American electricians
Burials in New York (state)
Suicides by firearm in New York (state)